is the twelfth studio album by Japanese singer Yōko Oginome. Produced by Ken Yoshida and released through Victor Entertainment on July 3, 1991, the album features the hit single "Bijo to Yajū". The song "Ame no Ishi" is a Japanese-language cover of Pebbles' 1990 song "Why Do I Believe". The album was reissued on May 26, 2010 with seven bonus tracks as part of Oginome's 25th anniversary celebration. 

The album peaked at No. 25 on Oricon's albums chart and sold over 23,000 copies.

Track listing

Charts

References

External links
 
 
  

1991 albums
Yōko Oginome albums
Japanese-language albums
Victor Entertainment albums

ja:TRUST Me